"The Scent of Fear" is television play written by Ted Willis. It was originally written for British anthology series Armchair Theatre, adapted from the story "Stowaway" by Mary Higgins Clark which was reportedly based on a real story that happened in 1949. It was filmed for Australian TV in 1960.

Plot
A youth in an Iron Curtain country, to escape from police, hides in a plane that is to fly to the UK. An air hostess finds him and he begs her not to turn him in. She has to hide him from various policemen.

1959 British TV Version

The play was first produced by ABC Weekend TV for the British ITV network in 1959.

Cast
Anthony Quayle as Colonel Kralik
Lorenza Colville as Eva Kralik
Frederick Schiller as Neumann
Alexis Chesnakov as Pechka
Neil McCallum as Karl Schling
Dorothy Tutin as Joan Bridey
John Carson as Tom Brook
Barrie Cookson as Harry Mylner
Jack Stewart as Dusty Fraser
Jacqueline Ellis as Peggy Court
Carl Duering as Sten
Wolfe Morris as Mueller
David Ritch as Brandt
Walter Gotell as 1st Policeman
Jan Conrad as 2nd Policeman

1960 Australian TV Version

The Australian version was directed by James Upshaw. Broadcast live on ABC's Sydney station, it was kinescoped ("telerecorded") for showing on other ABC stations.

Cast
Max Meldrum as the youth
Eric Reiman as Colonel Kralik
Diana Perryman as Joan Bridey, the hostess
Owen Weingott as Sten, disguised Communist head of police
Deryck Barnes
Brian Anderson
Colin Croft
Noni Rathesay
Carlotta Kalmar
Leonard Teale
George Roubiceck
Kenneth Hacker
Custl Korner
Peter Williams
Tony Standen
Barry Davies
Felix Martin
John Bell
Val Zika

Production
The show was filmed at ABC's Sydney studios with exteriors shot at Sydney's Kingsford Smith airport. Diana Perryman, who played an airhorstee, had been done.

Reception
The Sydney Morning Herald gave it a mixed review, but noted that "Max Meldrum made a superbly terrified fugitive" and "Owen Weingott was excellent as Sten, the disguised communist head of secret police".

US Screening
The play was bought for screening in the US by CBS in 1961 along with another Australian play, Outpost.

See also
List of live television plays broadcast on Australian Broadcasting Corporation (1950s)
List of television plays broadcast on Australian Broadcasting Corporation (1960s)

References

External links
1959 British tv version at IMDb
1960 Australian The Scent of Fear on IMDb
1960 Australia The Scent of Fear at National Film and Sound Archive

1960 television plays
Australian television plays
Australian Broadcasting Corporation original programming
English-language television shows
Black-and-white Australian television shows
Australian live television shows
Armchair Theatre
Television shows produced by ABC Weekend TV